Uku or UKU may refer to: 
 Ukko or Uku, god of sky, weather, crops (harvest) and other natural things in Estonian and Finnish mythology
 Uku (given name), Estonian masculine given name
 Uku, the First Beloved Man of a pre-nation Cherokee tribe
 UK Ultraspeed, proposed magnetic-levitation train line between London and Glasgow
 Uku (fish), a fish

Places
Uku, Angola, town in Angola
Uku, Nagasaki, town in Kitamatsuura District, Nagasaki, Japan
Uku, Nepal, village development committee in Darchula District, Mahakali Zone, Nepal
Uku, Estonia, village in Kadrina Parish, Lääne-Viru County, Estonia

See also
Uku Pacha, underworld located beneath the Earth's surface in Incan mythology